Malpighia cauliflora is a species of flowering plant in the family Malpighiaceae, that is endemic to Jamaica. It is threatened by habitat loss.

References

cauliflora
Plants described in 1982
Endangered plants
Endemic flora of Jamaica
Taxonomy articles created by Polbot